Greenwood College School is an independent co-educational middle school and high school located on the south-east corner of Mount Pleasant Road and Davisville Avenue in Toronto, Ontario, Canada.

History
Established in 2002 by Richard Wernham, Julia West, David J. Latimer and John R. Latimer, the school provides an experiential education to over 500 students in Grades 7 through 12. The school is housed in a facility built in 2002 which was expanded and renovated in 2016. In addition to its urban campus, Greenwood also uses several outdoor facilities.

Beginnings and growth
In the early 2000s, couple Richard Wernham and Julia West, along with father-son duo John R. Latimer and David "Lub" Latimer, imagined of a co-educational school in Toronto that would be an alternative to foremost independent schools in Toronto, which were mainly all single sex and offered the International Baccalaureate.

In 2008 it was announced that founding principal, David Thompson, left Greenwood in June of that year to become the Headmaster at Lakefield College School. The former Vice-Principal, Allan Hardy, was appointed his successor. 

Greenwood completed a renovation and expansion of its main facility in 2016. The expansion increased the school's square footage by 120% and added several new facilities, including a second gym, a performance theatre, new science labs, large Learning Community classrooms and a rooftop terrace outdoor classroom. Greenwood's sports teams also use nearby facilities including Leaside Arena, the University of Toronto Athletic Centre, Deer Park Pool and Sunnybrook Park.

Post expansion
After completing the renovation and expansion, Greenwood's student body grew to 500. In 2018, Sarah Bruce joined Greenwood as Principal, replacing Hardy.

Notable alumni
Emma Kim - Senior Synchronized Skating World Medalist and Hall of Fame Inductee

Tom Wilson (ice hockey) - Forward for the Washington Capitals

Tom Ramshaw -  Olympic Sailor

Fees
The tuition fee for the 2019–2020 academic year was $37,700. For new students there is a one time registration fee of $8,000. Tuition covers student participation in all school programs, including the Outdoor Leadership Program for Grades 7 to 11, which includes trips to locations across Canada. Like many independent schools with a Bring Your Own Device program, students are required to purchase a laptop with the required programs installed.

Clubs 

 Chinese Club
 Robotics Club
 CAD Club
 Debate Club
 Disney Club
 Chess Club
 Jazz Band
 Choir
 Kids Literature Club
 Science Club

Outdoor education
While balancing academics, Greenwood College School's students are immersed in the school's Outdoor Education Program and extensive Service Learning Program. The founders intended to create a school with strong academics, while also creating a learning environment in which children are given the opportunity to learn outdoors and a school in which leadership and teamwork is essential.

Greenwood's outdoor education program includes trips in the fall and the winter, considered to be essential character-building experiences that encourage the development of perseverance and leadership. The fall program begins a few days into the school year.

Service learning
Greenwood's Service Learning program gives students the opportunity to participate in a variety of initiatives. Every Wednesday, classes start late; this provides staff with the opportunity to participate in professional development sessions, while students take part in community service. 

Greenwood is also the only school in Ontario involved in the Hockey H.E.R.O.S. program in which Greenwood students act as hockey instructors to children aged 8 to 12 years from Toronto's inner city communities.

References

External links
 
 Student Site http://groodle.greenwoodcollege.com
 School blog

High schools in Toronto
Private schools in Toronto
Educational institutions established in 2002
2002 establishments in Ontario